The 1938 Ladies Open Championships was held at the Queen's Club, West Kensington, in London from 2–7 February 1938.Margot Lumb won her fourth consecutive title by defeating Mrs Sheila McKechnie in a repeat of the 1937 final. This fourth win set a new record, surpassing the three wins of Joyce Cave, Nancy Cave, Cecily Fenwick and Susan Noel.

Seeds

Draw and results

First round

+ denotes seed

Second round

Third round

Quarter-finals

Semi-finals

Final

References

Women's British Open Squash Championships
Women's British Open Squash Championships
Women's British Open Squash Championships
Women's British Open Squash Championships
Squash competitions in London
British Open Championships